The Mexico national tennis team represents Mexico in Davis Cup tennis competition and are governed by the Federación Mexicana de Tenis.

Mexico finished as runners-up in 1962 losing with Australia 5-0 in Melbourne. They currently compete in the World Group I Play-Offs.  They last competed in the World Group in 1997.

History
Mexico competed in its first Davis Cup in 1924.

Current team (2022)

 Gerardo López Villaseñor
 Alan Fernando Rubio Fierros
 Luis Carlos Álvarez Valdés
 Miguel Ángel Reyes Varela
 Santiago González (Doubles player)

See also
Davis Cup
Mexico Fed Cup team

External links

Davis Cup teams
Davis Cup
Davis Cup